The 1471 papal conclave (August 6–9) elected Pope Sixtus IV following the death of Pope Paul II. With the exception of the conclaves of the Western Schism, this conclave was the first since 1305 to feature a working, two-thirds majority of Italians within the College of Cardinals, in no small part because of the absence of six non-Italian cardinals. This was in part due to the unexpectedness of the death of Paul II.

The election
The two main factions were those of d'Estouteville and Orsini, the latter of whom secured a major pre-conclave victory in managing to persuade the rest of the College to exclude the cardinals created by Paul II in pectore, in explicit defiance of the last will and testament of the previous pontiff. Such creatures would be allowed to participate, for example, in the papal conclave, 1492. Paul II had created at least eight cardinals in secret, at least five of whom were alive at the time of the conclave: Pedro Ferriz, Pietro Foscari, Giovanni Battista Savelli, Ferry de Clugny, and Jan Vitez.

A conclave capitulation was drawn up at the beginning of the conclave, but unusually it contained no explicit limitations on papal power, except to continue the Crusading war against the Turks. The aforementioned factions can more specifically be referred to as the "Pieschi" (primarily the creations of Pius II) and the "Paoleschi" (primarily the creations of Paul II).

As in the immediately previous conclaves, Bessarion emerged as an early favorite, with six votes on the second day, those of: d'Estouteville, Calandrini, Capranica, Ammanati-Piccolomini, Caraffa, and Barbo; d'Estouteville trailed with the votes of Bessarion, Gonzaga, and Monferrato as did Forteguerri with the votes of Orsini, Eruli, and Agnifilo; Orsini got nods from della Rovere and Michiel; Roverella from Borgia and Zeno; Eruli from  Forteguerri; and Calandrini from Roverella. The old arguments against Bessarion, namely that he was a non-Italian, who in addition would be unacceptable to the princes of France, again prevailed.

The voting tallies are known with specificity because of the notes of Nicodemo de Pontremoli, sent to Duke of Milan Galeazzo Maria Sforza, currently residing in the State Archives of Milan. Notable favorites in the ensuing scrutinies are (chronologically): Calandrini, Forteguerri, and Roverella.

Of the favored candidates of Sforza, della Rovere was the most electable, so Gonzaga and Borja lobbied for him behind the scenes, all the while disguising their intentions by voting for others until the morning of August 9, when along with d'Estouteville and Barbo they changed their votes to della Rovere in the accessus, giving him a total of 13 votes. The cardinals voting for della Rovere in the scrutiny were: Monferrato, Zeno, Michiel, Agnifilo, Roverella, Forteguerri, Bessarion, Calandrini, and Orsini. Contrary to the perennial tradition, the five remaining cardinals did not change their votes to della Rovere in the accessus to make the election "unanimous".

Cardinal electors

Absentee cardinals

Notes

1471
15th-century elections
1471
15th-century Catholicism